Luis Enrique Mercado Sánchez (19 January 1952 – 28 December 2020) was a Mexican journalist and politician from the National Action Party.

Biography
Mercado began his career in journalism in El Universal and founded in 1988 El Economista. He later started Zacatecas radio station XHGPE-FM 96.1 "La Voz".

From 2009 to 2012, he served as Deputy of the LXI Legislature of the Mexican Congress representing Zacatecas.

Mercado died from COVID-19 on 28 December 2020, at the age of 68.

References

1955 births
2020 deaths
Politicians from Mexico City
Mexican journalists
National Action Party (Mexico) politicians
21st-century Mexican politicians
Deaths from the COVID-19 pandemic in Mexico
Members of the Chamber of Deputies (Mexico) for Zacatecas